Clemens Unit (CN) is a prison farm of the Texas Department of Criminal Justice (TDCJ) in unincorporated Brazoria County, Texas, in Greater Houston. The prison, in the Texas Gulf Coast region, is in proximity to the City of Brazoria, and it is in proximity to the Velasco community, now a part of Freeport. The prison is situated south of Houston.

History

In 1890 William C. Clemens, the chairman of the Texas Prison Board, purchased an initial parcel of land from the Huntington Estate for $4,126. The prison, named after Clemens, opened in 1893. The State of Texas bought the entire prison, then , in 1899. The property included the William Clemens mill and sugar plantation. The prison was the first state prison in Brazoria County.

The state later added a neighboring plantation, making Clemens have  of land. In 1935 Clemens housed African-American prisoners when the system was segregated. In 1963, before racial desegregation occurred, the facility housed first offender African Americans.

In the mid-1990s, the Texas Department of Criminal Justice (TDCJ) removed older violent offenders from the institution and replaced them with younger offenders; most of them were 25 or younger. The administration segregated younger prisoners from the others; the inmates called their area a "kiddie farm." In 1995 the State of Texas lowered its minimum age at which a juvenile can be tried as an adult from 15 to 14. Wayne Scott, the executive director of the TDCJ, established the Youth Offender Program, to house prisoners 14 to 16 years old who were sentenced as adults, new arrivals aged 17–20, and prisoners transferred out of the Texas Youth Commission, aged 16–18 and with determinate sentences.

Rodney Hulin, a 17-year-old prisoner, reported being raped, harassed and assaulted by fellow inmates of his age group after his November 1995 transfer to a division for younger offenders in Clemens. Although he became a symbol of a movement that advocates keeping juvenile offenders housed separately from adults in prison institutions, his case was more complex, as he was attacked by prisoners his own age.  Michael Berryhill, a journalist who wrote at length about this case, found that the prison was not yet organized to support its population.  After being attacked and harassed, and failing to gain protection from prison officials, Hulin hanged himself. He was saved but had suffered severe brain damage and died four months later.

Operations
As of 2004 Clemens produces agricultural products such as edible and field crops and livestock. As of that year most of the inmates at Clemens, at all custody level, are second-time offenders.

Notable Inmates
David Brooks (Accomplice of Dean Corll)
Rodney Hulin
Dylan Maycroft

Cemeteries
The prison has two historic cemeteries. One, a cemetery of offenders who died from a virus epidemic, is located near the unit dog kennels. The second cemetery, in the Two Camp area on the Huntington Estate, has the graves of Thomas and Thompson McNeil.

References

External links

 Clemens Unit

Prisons in Brazoria County, Texas
1893 establishments in Texas
Buildings and structures in Brazoria County, Texas